The 67th United States Congress was a meeting of the legislative branch of the United States federal government, consisting of the United States Senate and the United States House of Representatives. It met in Washington, D.C. from March 4, 1921, to March 4, 1923, during the first two years of Warren Harding's presidency.  The apportionment of seats in the House of Representatives was based on the 1910 United States census.

The Republicans increased their majorities in both chambers—gaining supermajority status in the House—and with Warren G. Harding being sworn in a president, this gave the Republicans an overall federal government trifecta for the first time since the 61st Congress in 1909.

This was the first Congress to feature a woman senator appointed in the United States Senate, Rebecca L. Felton of Georgia, who held in office for one day. This remains the most recent congress in which Republicans held a two-thirds supermajority in the House of Representatives.

Major events

 March 4, 1921: Warren G. Harding inaugurated as President of the United States

Major legislation

 April 30, 1921: Port Authority of New York and New Jersey (under an interstate compact entered into by the State of New York and State of New Jersey)
 May 19, 1921: Emergency Quota Act (Johnson Quota Act), Sess. 1, ch. 8, 
 May 27, 1921: Emergency Tariff of 1921, Sess. 1, ch. 14, 
 June 10, 1921: Budget and Accounting Act of 1921 (Good–McCormack Act)
 June 10, 1921: Willis Graham Act
 July 2, 1921: Knox–Porter Resolution
 July 9, 1921: Hawaiian Homes Commission Act of 1921
 July 12, 1921: Naval Appropriations Act For 1922
 August 15, 1921: Packers and Stockyards Act of 1921
 August 15, 1921: Poultry Racket Act
 August 24, 1921: Future Trading Act (Capper–Tincher Act), Sess. 1, ch. 86, 
 November 9, 1921: Federal Aid Highway Act of 1921 (Phipps–Dowell Act)
 November 23, 1921: Revenue Act of 1921, Sess. 1, ch. 136, 
 November 23, 1921: Willis–Campbell Act
 November 23, 1921: Sheppard–Towner Act
 December 22, 1921: Russian Famine Relief Act
 February 9, 1922: World War Foreign Debts Commission Act
 February 18, 1922: Capper–Volstead Act
 February 18, 1922: Patent Act of 1922
 March 4, 1922: Model Marine Insurance Act of 1922
 March 20, 1922: Seed and Grain Loan Act
 March 20, 1922: General Exchange Act of 1922
 May 11, 1922: Agricultural Appropriations Act of 1922
 May 11, 1922: Travelling Expenses Publication Activities Act
 May 15, 1922: Irrigation Districts and Farm Loans Act (Raker Act)
 May 26, 1922: Narcotic Drugs Import and Export Act (Jones-Miller Act)
 June 10, 1922: Joint Service Pay Readjustment Act
 June 30, 1922: Lodge–Fish Resolution
 July 1, 1922: Scrapping of Naval Vessels Act
 August 31, 1922: Honeybee Act
 September 14, 1922: Judges Act of 1922 (Cummins–Walsh Act)
 September 19, 1922: China Trade Act of 1922
 September 21, 1922: Commodity Exchange Act
 September 21, 1922: Fordney–McCumber Tariff, Sess. 2, ch. 356, 
 September 21, 1922: Grain Futures Act, Sess. 2, ch. 369, 
 September 22, 1922: Cable Act (Married Women's Citizenship Act), Sess. 2, ch. 411, 
 September 22, 1922: Fuel Distributor Act (Lever Act)
 September 22, 1922: River and Harbors Act of 1922
 January 5, 1923: Foreign and Domestic Commerce Act of 1923
 February 26, 1923: Agricultural Appropriations Act of 1924
 February 28, 1923: British War Debt Act of 1923 (Smoot–Burton Act)
 March 2, 1923: Porter Resolution
 March 3, 1923: River and Harbors Act of 1923
 March 3, 1923: Naval Stores Act of 1923
 March 4, 1923: Partial Payment Act (Winslow Act)
 March 4, 1923: Butter Standards Act of 1923
 March 4, 1923: Filled Milk Act of 1923
 March 4, 1923: Cotton Standards Act of 1923
 March 4, 1923: National Bank Tax Act of 1923
 March 4, 1923: Agricultural Credits Act (Capper–Linroot–Anderson Act)
 March 4, 1923: Classification Act of 1923 (Sterling–Lehlbach Act)
 March 4, 1923: Flood Control Act of 1923
 March 4, 1923: Mills Act of 1923

Party summary
The count below identifies party affiliations at the beginning of the first session of this Congress, and includes members from vacancies and newly admitted states, when they were first seated. Changes resulting from subsequent replacements are shown below in the "Changes in membership" section.

Senate

House of Representatives

Leadership

Senate
 President: Calvin Coolidge (R)
 President pro tempore: Albert B. Cummins (R)

Majority (Republican) leadership
 Majority Leader: Henry Cabot Lodge
 Majority Whip: Charles Curtis
 Republican Conference Secretary: James Wolcott Wadsworth Jr.
 National Senatorial Committee Chair: Joseph M. McCormick

Minority (Democratic) leadership
 Minority Leader: Oscar Underwood
 Minority Whip: Peter G. Gerry
 Democratic Caucus Secretary: William H. King

House of Representatives
 Speaker: Frederick H. Gillett (R)

Majority (Republican) leadership
 Majority Leader: Franklin Mondell
 Majority Whip: Harold Knutson
 Republican Conference Chairman: Horace Mann Towner
 Republican Campaign Committee Chairman: Simeon D. Fess, until 1922
 William R. Wood, from 1922

Minority (Democratic) leadership
 Minority Leader: Claude Kitchin
 Minority Whip: William Allan Oldfield
 Democratic Caucus Chairman: Sam Rayburn
 Democratic Campaign Committee Chairman: Arthur B. Rouse

Members
This list is arranged by chamber, then by state. Senators are listed by class; Representatives are listed by district.
Skip to House of Representatives, below

Senate
Senators were elected every two years, with one-third beginning new six-year terms with each Congress. Preceding the names in the list below are Senate class numbers, which indicate the cycle of their election. In this Congress, Class 1 meant their term ended with this Congress, requiring re-election in 1922; Class 2 meant their term began in the last Congress, requiring re-election in 1924; and Class 3 meant their term began with this Congress, requiring re-election in 1926.

Alabama
 2. J. Thomas Heflin (D)
 3. Oscar W. Underwood (D)

Arizona
 1. Henry F. Ashurst (D)
 3. Ralph H. Cameron (R)

Arkansas
 2. Joseph T. Robinson (D)
 3. Thaddeus H. Caraway (D)

California
 1. Hiram W. Johnson (R)
 3. Samuel M. Shortridge (R)

Colorado
 2. Lawrence C. Phipps (R)
 3. Samuel D. Nicholson (R)

Connecticut
 1. George P. McLean (R)
 3. Frank B. Brandegee (R)

Delaware
 1. Josiah O. Wolcott (D), until July 2, 1921
 T. Coleman du Pont (R), from July 7, 1921, until November 7, 1922
 Thomas F. Bayard Jr. (D), from November 8, 1922
 2. L. Heisler Ball (R)

Florida
 1. Park Trammell (D)
 3. Duncan U. Fletcher (D)

Georgia
 2. William J. Harris (D)
 3. Thomas E. Watson (D), until September 26, 1922
 Rebecca L. Felton (D), from November 21, 1922 until November 22, 1922
 Walter F. George (D), from November 22, 1922

Idaho
 2. William E. Borah (R)
 3. Frank R. Gooding (R)

Illinois
 2. J. Medill McCormick (R)
 3. William B. McKinley (R)

Indiana
 1. Harry S. New (R)
 3. James E. Watson (R)

Iowa
 2. William S. Kenyon (R), until February 24, 1922
 Charles A. Rawson (R), from February 24, 1922, until November 7, 1922
 Smith W. Brookhart (R), from November 8, 1922
 3. Albert B. Cummins (R)

Kansas
 2. Arthur Capper (R)
 3. Charles Curtis (R)

Kentucky
 2. Augustus O. Stanley (D)
 3. Richard P. Ernst (R)

Louisiana
 2. Joseph E. Ransdell (D)
 3. Edwin S. Broussard (D)

Maine
 1. Frederick Hale (R)
 2. Bert M. Fernald (R)

Maryland
 1. Joseph I. France (R)
 3. Ovington E. Weller (R)

Massachusetts
 1. Henry Cabot Lodge (R)
 2. David I. Walsh (D)

Michigan
 1. Charles E. Townsend (R)
 2. Truman H. Newberry (R), until November 18, 1922
 James J. Couzens (R), from November 29, 1922

Minnesota
 1. Frank B. Kellogg (R)
 2. Knute Nelson (R)

Mississippi
 1. John Sharp Williams (D)
 2. B. Patton Harrison (D)

Missouri
 1. James A. Reed (D)
 3. Selden P. Spencer (R)

Montana
 1. Henry L. Myers (D)
 2. Thomas J. Walsh (D)

Nebraska
 1. Gilbert M. Hitchcock (D)
 2. George W. Norris (R)

Nevada
 1. Key Pittman (D)
 3. Tasker L. Oddie (R)

New Hampshire
 2. Henry W. Keyes (R)
 3. George H. Moses (R)

New Jersey
 1. Joseph S. Frelinghuysen (R)
 2. Walter E. Edge (R)

New Mexico
 1. Andrieus A. Jones (D)
 2. Albert B. Fall (R), until March 4, 1921
 Holm O. Bursum (R), from March 11, 1921

New York
 1. William M. Calder (R)
 3. James W. Wadsworth Jr. (R)

North Carolina
 2. Furnifold McL. Simmons (D)
 3. Lee S. Overman (D)

North Dakota
 1. Porter J. McCumber (R)
 3. Edwin F. Ladd (R)

Ohio
 1. Atlee Pomerene (D)
 3. Frank B. Willis (R)

Oklahoma
 2. Robert L. Owen (D)
 3. John W. Harreld (R)

Oregon
 2. Charles L. McNary (R)
 3. Robert N. Stanfield (R)

Pennsylvania
 1. Philander C. Knox (R), until October 12, 1921
 William E. Crow (R), from October 24, 1921, until August 2, 1922
 David A. Reed (R),  from August 8, 1922
 3. Boies Penrose (R), until December 31, 1921
 George Wharton Pepper (R), from January 9, 1922

Rhode Island
 1. Peter G. Gerry (D)
 2. LeBaron B. Colt (R)

South Carolina
 2. Nathaniel B. Dial (D)
 3. Ellison D. Smith (D)

South Dakota
 2. Thomas Sterling (R)
 3. Peter Norbeck (R)

Tennessee
 1. Kenneth D. McKellar (D)
 2. John K. Shields (D)

Texas
 1. Charles A. Culberson (D)
 2. Morris Sheppard (D)

Utah
 1. William H. King (D)
 3. Reed Smoot (R)

Vermont
 1. Carroll S. Page (R)
 3. William P. Dillingham (R)

Virginia
 1. Claude A. Swanson (D)
 2. Carter Glass (D)

Washington
 1. Miles Poindexter (R)
 3. Wesley L. Jones (R)

West Virginia
 1. Howard Sutherland (R)
 2. Davis Elkins (R)

Wisconsin
 1. Robert M. La Follette Sr. (R)
 3. Irvine L. Lenroot (R)

Wyoming
 1. John B. Kendrick (D)
 2. Francis E. Warren (R)

House of Representatives

Alabama
 . John McDuffie (D)
 . John R. Tyson (D)
 . Henry B. Steagall (D)
 . Lamar Jeffers (D), from June 7, 1921
 . William B. Bowling (D)
 . William B. Oliver (D)
 . Lilius B. Rainey (D)
 . Edward B. Almon (D)
 . George Huddleston (D)
 . William B. Bankhead (D)

Arizona
 . Carl Hayden (D)

Arkansas
 . William J. Driver (D)
 . William A. Oldfield (D)
 . John N. Tillman (D)
 . Otis T. Wingo (D)
 . Henderson M. Jacoway (D)
 . Samuel M. Taylor (D), until September 13, 1921
 Chester W. Taylor (D), from October 25, 1921
 . Tilman B. Parks (D)

California
 . Clarence F. Lea (D)
 . John E. Raker (D)
 . Charles F. Curry (R)
 . Julius Kahn (R)
 . John I. Nolan (R), until November 18, 1922
 Mae E. Nolan (R), from January 23, 1923
 . John A. Elston (R), until December 15, 1921
 James H. MacLafferty (R), from November 7, 1922
 . Henry E. Barbour (R)
 . Arthur M. Free (R)
 . Walter F. Lineberger (R), from February 15, 1921
 . Henry Z. Osborne (R), until February 8, 1923
 . Philip D. Swing (R)

Colorado
 . William N. Vaile (R)
 . Charles B. Timberlake (R)
 . Guy U. Hardy (R)
 . Edward T. Taylor (D)

Connecticut
 . E. Hart Fenn (R)
 . Richard P. Freeman (R)
 . John Q. Tilson (R)
 . Schuyler Merritt (R)
 . James P. Glynn (R)

Delaware
 . Caleb R. Layton (R)

Florida
 . Herbert J. Drane (D)
 . Frank Clark (D)
 . John H. Smithwick (D)
 . William J. Sears (D)

Georgia
 . James W. Overstreet (D)
 . Frank Park (D)
 . Charles R. Crisp (D)
 . William C. Wright (D)
 . William D. Upshaw (D)
 . James W. Wise (D)
 . Gordon Lee (D)
 . Charles H. Brand (D)
 . Thomas M. Bell (D)
 . Carl Vinson (D)
 . William C. Lankford (D)
 . William W. Larsen (D)

Idaho
 . Burton L. French (R)
 . Addison T. Smith (R)

Illinois
 . William E. Mason (R), until June 16, 1921
 Winnifred S. M. Huck (R), from November 7, 1922
 . Richard Yates (R)
 . Martin B. Madden (R)
 . James R. Mann (R), until November 30, 1922
 . Elliott W. Sproul (R)
 . John W. Rainey (D)
 . Adolph J. Sabath (D)
 . John J. Gorman (R)
 . M. Alfred Michaelson (R)
 . Stanley H. Kunz (D)
 . Frederick A. Britten (R)
 . Carl R. Chindblom (R)
 . Ira C. Copley (R)
 . Charles E. Fuller (R)
 . John C. McKenzie (R)
 . William J. Graham (R)
 . Edward J. King (R)
 . Clifford C. Ireland (R)
 . Frank H. Funk (R)
 . Joseph G. Cannon (R)
 . Allen F. Moore (R)
 . Guy L. Shaw (R)
 . Loren E. Wheeler (R)
 . William A. Rodenberg (R)
 . Edwin B. Brooks (R)
 . Thomas S. Williams (R)
 . Edward E. Denison (R)

Indiana
 . Oscar R. Luhring (R)
 . Oscar E. Bland (R)
 . James W. Dunbar (R)
 . John S. Benham (R)
 . Everett Sanders (R)
 . Richard N. Elliott (R)
 . Merrill Moores (R)
 . Albert H. Vestal (R)
 . Fred S. Purnell (R)
 . William R. Wood (R)
 . Milton Kraus (R)
 . Louis W. Fairfield (R)
 . Andrew J. Hickey (R)

Iowa
 . William F. Kopp (R)
 . Harry E. Hull (R)
 . Burton E. Sweet (R)
 . Gilbert N. Haugen (R)
 . James W. Good (R), until June 15, 1921
 Cyrenus Cole (R), from July 19, 1921
 . C. William Ramseyer (R)
 . Cassius C. Dowell (R)
 . Horace M. Towner (R)
 . William R. Green (R)
 . Lester J. Dickinson (R)
 . William D. Boies (R)

Kansas
 . Daniel R. Anthony Jr. (R)
 . Edward C. Little (R)
 . Philip P. Campbell (R)
 . Homer Hoch (R)
 . James G. Strong (R)
 . Hays B. White (R)
 . Jasper N. Tincher (R)
 . Richard E. Bird (R)

Kentucky
 . Alben W. Barkley (D)
 . David H. Kincheloe (D)
 . Robert Y. Thomas Jr. (D)
 . Ben Johnson (D)
 . Charles F. Ogden (R)
 . Arthur B. Rouse (D)
 . James C. Cantrill (D)
 . Ralph W. E. Gilbert (D)
 . William J. Fields (D)
 . John W. Langley (R)
 . John M. Robsion (R)

Louisiana
 . James O'Connor (D)
 . H. Garland Dupré (D)
 . Whitmell P. Martin (D)
 . John N. Sandlin (D)
 . Riley J. Wilson (D)
 . George K. Favrot (D)
 . Ladislas Lazaro (D)
 . James B. Aswell (D)

Maine
 . Carroll L. Beedy (R)
 . Wallace H. White Jr. (R)
 . John A. Peters (R), until January 2, 1922
 John E. Nelson (R), from March 20, 1922
 . Ira G. Hersey (R)

Maryland
 . T. Alan Goldsborough (D)
 . Albert A. Blakeney (R)
 . John Philip Hill (R)
 . J. Charles Linthicum (D)
 . Sydney E. Mudd, II (R)
 . Frederick N. Zihlman (R)

Massachusetts
 . Allen T. Treadway (R)
 . Frederick H. Gillett (R)
 . Calvin D. Paige (R)
 . Samuel E. Winslow (R)
 . John Jacob Rogers (R)
 . Willfred W. Lufkin (R), until June 30, 1921
 A. Piatt Andrew Jr. (R), from September 27, 1921
 . Robert S. Maloney (R)
 . Frederick W. Dallinger (R)
 . Charles L. Underhill (R)
 . Peter F. Tague (D)
 . George Holden Tinkham (R)
 . James A. Gallivan (D)
 . Robert Luce (R)
 . Louis A. Frothingham (R)
 . William S. Greene (R)
 . Joseph Walsh (R), until August 2, 1922
 Charles L. Gifford (R), from November 7, 1922

Michigan
 . George P. Codd (R)
 . Earl C. Michener (R)
 . William H. Frankhauser (R), until May 9, 1921
 John M. C. Smith (R), from June 28, 1921
 . John C. Ketcham (R)
 . Carl E. Mapes (R)
 . Patrick H. Kelley (R)
 . Louis C. Cramton (R)
 . Joseph W. Fordney (R)
 . James C. McLaughlin (R)
 . Roy O. Woodruff (R)
 . Frank D. Scott (R)
 . W. Frank James (R)
 . Vincent M. Brennan (R)

Minnesota
 . Sydney Anderson (R)
 . Frank Clague (R)
 . Charles R. Davis (R)
 . Oscar E. Keller (R)
 . Walter H. Newton (R)
 . Harold Knutson (R)
 . Andrew J. Volstead (R)
 . Oscar J. Larson (R)
 . Halvor Steenerson (R)
 . Thomas D. Schall (R)

Mississippi
 . John E. Rankin (D)
 . Bill G. Lowrey (D)
 . Benjamin G. Humphreys, II (D)
 . Thomas U. Sisson (D)
 . Ross A. Collins (D)
 . Paul B. Johnson Sr. (D)
 . Percy E. Quin (D)
 . James W. Collier (D)

Missouri
 . Frank C. Millspaugh (R), until December 5, 1922
 . William W. Rucker (D)
 . Henry F. Lawrence (R)
 . Charles L. Faust (R)
 . Edgar C. Ellis (R)
 . William O. Atkeson (R)
 . Roscoe C. Patterson (R)
 . Sidney C. Roach (R)
 . Theodore W. Hukriede (R)
 . Cleveland A. Newton (R)
 . Harry B. Hawes (D)
 . Leonidas C. Dyer (R)
 . Marion E. Rhodes (R)
 . Edward D. Hays (R)
 . Isaac V. McPherson (R)
 . Samuel A. Shelton (R)

Montana
 . Washington J. McCormick (R)
 . Carl W. Riddick (R)

Nebraska
 . C. Frank Reavis (R), until June 3, 1922
 Roy H. Thorpe (R), from November 7, 1922
 . Albert W. Jefferis (R)
 . Robert E. Evans (R)
 . Melvin O. McLaughlin (R)
 . William E. Andrews (R)
 . Moses P. Kinkaid (R), until July 6, 1922
 Augustin R. Humphrey (R), from November 7, 1922

Nevada
 . Samuel S. Arentz (R)

New Hampshire
 . Sherman E. Burroughs (R), until January 27, 1923
 . Edward H. Wason (R)

New Jersey
 . Francis F. Patterson Jr. (R)
 . Isaac Bacharach (R)
 . T. Frank Appleby (R)
 . Elijah C. Hutchinson (R)
 . Ernest R. Ackerman (R)
 . Randolph Perkins (R)
 . Amos H. Radcliffe (R)
 . Herbert W. Taylor (R)
 . Richard Wayne Parker (R)
 . Frederick R. Lehlbach (R)
 . Archibald E. Olpp (R)
 . Charles F.X. O'Brien (D)

New Mexico
 . Néstor Montoya (R), until January 13, 1923

New York
 . Frederick C. Hicks (R)
 . John J. Kindred (D)
 . John Kissel (R)
 . Thomas H. Cullen (D)
 . Ardolph L. Kline (R)
 . Warren I. Lee (R)
 . Michael J. Hogan (R)
 . Charles G. Bond (R)
 . Andrew N. Petersen (R)
 . Lester D. Volk (R)
 . Daniel J. Riordan (D)
 . Meyer London (Soc.)
 . Christopher D. Sullivan (D)
 . Nathan D. Perlman (R)
 . Thomas J. Ryan (R)
 . W. Bourke Cockran (D), until March 1, 1923
 . Ogden L. Mills (R)
 . John F. Carew (D)
 . Walter M. Chandler (R)
 . Isaac Siegel (R)
 . Martin C. Ansorge (R)
 . Anthony J. Griffin (D)
 . Albert B. Rossdale (R)
 . Benjamin L. Fairchild (R)
 . James W. Husted (R)
 . Hamilton Fish Jr. (R)
 . Charles B. Ward (R)
 . Peter G. Ten Eyck (D)
 . James S. Parker (R)
 . Frank Crowther (R)
 . Bertrand H. Snell (R)
 . Luther W. Mott (R)
 . Homer P. Snyder (R)
 . John D. Clarke (R)
 . Walter W. Magee (R)
 . Norman J. Gould (R)
 . Alanson B. Houghton (R), until February 28, 1922
 Lewis Henry (R), from April 11, 1922
 . Thomas B. Dunn (R)
 . Archie D. Sanders (R)
 . S. Wallace Dempsey (R)
 . Clarence MacGregor (R)
 . James M. Mead (D)
 . Daniel A. Reed (R)

North Carolina
 . Hallett S. Ward (D)
 . Claude Kitchin (D)
 . Samuel M. Brinson (D), until April 13, 1922
 Charles L. Abernethy (D), from November 7, 1922
 . Edward W. Pou (D)
 . Charles M. Stedman (D)
 . Homer L. Lyon (D)
 . William C. Hammer (D)
 . Robert L. Doughton (D)
 . Alfred L. Bulwinkle (D)
 . Zebulon Weaver (D)

North Dakota
 . Olger B. Burtness (R)
 . George M. Young (R)
 . James H. Sinclair (R)

Ohio
 . Nicholas Longworth (R)
 . Ambrose E.B. Stephens (R)
 . Roy G. Fitzgerald (R)
 . John L. Cable (R)
 . Charles J. Thompson (R)
 . Charles C. Kearns (R)
 . Simeon D. Fess (R)
 . R. Clinton Cole (R)
 . William W. Chalmers (R)
 . Israel M. Foster (R)
 . Edwin D. Ricketts (R)
 . John C. Speaks (R)
 . James T. Begg (R)
 . Charles L. Knight (R)
 . C. Ellis Moore (R)
 . Joseph H. Himes (R)
 . William M. Morgan (R)
 . B. Frank Murphy (R)
 . John G. Cooper (R)
 . Miner G. Norton (R)
 . Harry C. Gahn (R)
 . Theodore E. Burton (R)

Oklahoma
 . Thomas A. Chandler (R)
 . Alice M. Robertson (R)
 . Charles D. Carter (D)
 . Joseph C. Pringey (R)
 . Fletcher B. Swank (D)
 . Lorraine M. Gensman (R)
 . James V. McClintic (D)
 . Manuel Herrick (R)

Oregon
 . Willis C. Hawley (R)
 . Nicholas J. Sinnott (R)
 . Clifton N. McArthur (R)

Pennsylvania
 . William J. Burke (R)
 . Thomas S. Crago (R), from September 20, 1921
 . Joseph McLaughlin (R)
 . Anderson H. Walters (R)
 . William S. Vare (R), until January 2, 1923
 . George S. Graham (R)
 . Harry C. Ransley (R)
 . George W. Edmonds (R)
 . James J. Connolly (R)
 . George P. Darrow (R)
 . Thomas S. Butler (R)
 . Henry W. Watson (R)
 . William W. Griest (R)
 . Charles R. Connell (R), until September 26, 1922
 . Clarence D. Coughlin (R)
 . John Reber (R)
 . Fred B. Gernerd (R)
 . Louis T. McFadden (R)
 . Edgar R. Kiess (R)
 . I. Clinton Kline (R)
 . Benjamin K. Focht (R)
 . Aaron S. Kreider (R)
 . John M. Rose (R)
 . Edward S. Brooks (R)
 . Evan J. Jones (R)
 . Adam M. Wyant (R)
 . Samuel A. Kendall (R)
 . Henry W. Temple (R)
 . Milton W. Shreve (IR)
 . William H. Kirkpatrick (R)
 . Nathan L. Strong (R)
 . Harris J. Bixler (R)
 . Stephen G. Porter (R)
 . M. Clyde Kelly (R)
 . John M. Morin (R)
 . Guy E. Campbell (D)

Rhode Island
 . Clark Burdick (R)
 . Walter R. Stiness (R)
 . Ambrose Kennedy (R)

South Carolina
 . W. Turner Logan (D)
 . James F. Byrnes (D)
 . Frederick H. Dominick (D)
 . John J. McSwain (D)
 . William F. Stevenson (D)
 . Philip H. Stoll (D)
 . Hampton P. Fulmer (D)

South Dakota
 . Charles A. Christopherson (R)
 . Royal C. Johnson (R)
 . William Williamson (R)

Tennessee
 . B. Carroll Reece (R)
 . J. Will Taylor (R)
 . Joseph Edgar Brown (R)
 . Wynne F. Clouse (R)
 . Ewin L. Davis (D)
 . Joseph W. Byrns Sr. (D)
 . Lemuel P. Padgett (D), until August 2, 1922
 Clarence W. Turner (D), from November 7, 1922
 . Lon A. Scott (R)
 . Finis J. Garrett (D)
 . Hubert F. Fisher (D)

Texas
 . Eugene Black (D)
 . John C. Box (D)
 . Morgan G. Sanders (D)
 . Samuel T. Rayburn (D)
 . Hatton W. Sumners (D)
 . Rufus Hardy (D)
 . Clay Stone Briggs (D)
 . Daniel E. Garrett (D)
 . Joseph J. Mansfield (D)
 . James P. Buchanan (D)
 . Thomas T. Connally (D)
 . Fritz G. Lanham (D)
 . Lucian W. Parrish (D), until March 27, 1922
 Guinn Williams (D), from May 22, 1922
 . Harry M. Wurzbach (R)
 . John N. Garner (D)
 . Claude B. Hudspeth (D)
 . Thomas L. Blanton (D)
 . J. Marvin Jones (D)

Utah
 . Don B. Colton (R)
 . Elmer O. Leatherwood (R)

Vermont
 . Frank L. Greene (R)
 . Porter H. Dale (R)

Virginia
 . Schuyler Otis Bland (D)
 . Joseph T. Deal (D)
 . Andrew J. Montague (D)
 . Patrick Henry Drewry (D)
 . Rorer A. James (D), until August 6, 1921
 James M. Hooker (D), from November 8, 1921
 . James P. Woods (D)
 . Thomas W. Harrison (D), until December 15, 1922
 John Paul Jr. (R), from December 15, 1922
 . R. Walton Moore (D)
 . C. Bascom Slemp (R)
 . Henry D. Flood (D), until December 8, 1921
 Henry St. George Tucker III (D), from March 21, 1922

Washington
 . John F. Miller (R)
 . Lindley H. Hadley (R)
 . Albert Johnson (R)
 . John W. Summers (R)
 . J. Stanley Webster (R)

West Virginia
 . Benjamin L. Rosenbloom (R)
 . George M. Bowers (R)
 . Stuart F. Reed (R)
 . Harry C. Woodyard (R)
 . Wells Goodykoontz (R)
 . Leonard S. Echols (R)

Wisconsin
 . Henry A. Cooper (R)
 . Edward Voigt (R)
 . John M. Nelson (R)
 . John C. Kleczka (R)
 . William H. Stafford (R)
 . Florian Lampert (R)
 . Joseph D. Beck (R)
 . Edward E. Browne (R)
 . David G. Classon (R)
 . James A. Frear (R)
 . Adolphus P. Nelson (R)

Wyoming
 . Franklin W. Mondell (R)

Non-voting members
 . Daniel A. Sutherland (R)
 . J. Kuhio Kalaniana'ole (R), until January 7, 1922
 Henry Baldwin (R), from March 25, 1922
 . Jaime C. de Veyra (Nac.)
 . Isauro Gabaldon (Nac.)
 . Félix Córdova Dávila

Changes in membership
The count below reflects changes from the beginning of the first session of this Congress.

Senate
 Replacements: 11
 Democratic: no net change
 Republican: no net change
 Deaths: 4
 Resignations: 4
 Vacancy: 0
 Total seats with changes:  7

House of Representatives
 Replacements: 19
 Democratic: no net change
 Republican: no net change
 Deaths: 18
 Resignations: 8
 Contested elections: 1
 Total seats with changes: 30

Committees

Senate

 Additional Accommodations for the Library of Congress (Select)
 Agriculture and Forestry (Chairman: George W. Norris; Ranking Member: Ellison D. Smith)
 Appropriations (Chairman: Francis E. Warren; Ranking Member: Lee S. Overman)
 Audit and Control the Contingent Expenses of the Senate (Chairman: William M. Calder; Ranking Member: Andrieus A. Jones)
 Banking and Currency (Chairman: George P. McLean; Ranking Member: Robert L. Owen)
 Canadian Relations (Chairman: Frederick Hale)
 Census (Chairman: Howard Sutherland; Ranking Member: Joseph T. Robinson)
 Civil Service (Chairman: Thomas Sterling; Ranking Member: Kenneth McKellar)
 Civil Service Commission Examining Division (Select)
 Claims (Chairman: Arthur Capper; Ranking Member: Joseph T. Robinson)
 Coast and Insular Survey (Chairman: Walter Evans Edge)
 Coast Defenses (Chairman: Joseph S. Frelinghuysen)
 Commerce (Chairman: Wesley L. Jones; Ranking Member: Duncan U. Fletcher)
 Conservation of National Resources (Chairman: LeBaron B. Colt)
 Corporations Organized in the District of Columbia (Chairman: Atlee Pomerene)
 Crop Insurance (Select)
 Cuban Relations (Chairman: Hiram W. Johnson)
 Disposition of Useless Papers in the Executive Departments (Chairman: N/A; Ranking Member: N/A)
 District of Columbia (Chairman: L. Heisler Ball; Ranking Member: Atlee Pomerene)
 Education and Labor (Chairman: William S. Kenyon then William E. Borah; Ranking Member: Andrieus A. Jones)
 Engrossed Bills (Chairman: N/A; Ranking Member: N/A)
 Enrolled Bills (Chairman: Howard Sutherland; Ranking Member: Nathaniel B. Dial)
 Establish a university in the United States (Select)
 Examine the Several Branches in the Civil Service (Select)
 Execution without Trial in France (Special)
 Expenditures in the Department of Labor (Chairman: N/A; Ranking Member: N/A)
 Expenditures in the Post Office Department (Chairman: N/A; Ranking Member: N/A)
 Expenditures in Executive Departments (Chairman: Medill McCormick; Ranking Member: Oscar W. Underwood)
 Ex-servicemen Bureaus and Agencies (Select)
 Finance (Chairman: Porter J. McCumber; Ranking Member: Furnifold M. Simmons)
 Fisheries (Chairman: N/A; Ranking Member: N/A)
 Five Civilized Tribes of Indians
 Foreign Relations (Chairman: Henry Cabot Lodge; Ranking Member: Gilbert M. Hitchcock)
 Forest Reservations and the Protection of Game
 Geological Survey
 Haiti and Santo Domingo
 Immigration (Chairman: LeBaron B. Colt; Ranking Member: William H. King)
 Indian Affairs (Chairman: Selden P. Spencer; Ranking Member: Henry F. Ashurst)
 Industrial Expositions (Chairman: N/A; Ranking Member: N/A)
 Interoceanic Canals (Chairman: William E. Borah; Ranking Member: Thomas J. Walsh)
 Interstate Commerce (Chairman: Albert B. Cummins; Ranking Member: Ellison D. Smith)
 Irrigation and Reclamation (Chairman: Charles L. McNary; Ranking Member: Morris Sheppard)
 Judiciary (Chairman: Knute Nelson; Ranking Member: Charles A. Culberson) 
 Library (Chairman: Frank B. Brandegee; Ranking Member: John Sharp Williams)
 Manufactures (Chairman: Robert M. La Follette; Ranking Member: Ellison D. Smith)
 Military Affairs (Chairman: James W. Wadsworth Jr.; Ranking Member: Gilbert M. Hitchcock)
 Mines and Mining (Chairman: Miles Poindexter; Ranking Member: Thomas J. Walsh)
 Mississippi River and its Tributaries (Select)
 National Banks (Chairman: N/A; Ranking Member: N/A)
 Naval Affairs (Chairman: Carroll S. Page; Ranking Member: Claude A. Swanson)
 Nine Foot Channel from the Great Lakes to the Gulf (Select)
 Pacific Islands, Puerto Rico and the Virgin Islands (Chairman: N/A; Ranking Member: N/A)
 Patents (Chairman: Hiram W. Johnson; Ranking Member: Ellison D. Smith)
 Pensions (Chairman: Holm O. Bursum; Ranking Member: Thomas J. Walsh) 
 Post Office and Post Roads (Chairman: Charles E. Townsend; Ranking Member: Kenneth McKellar)
 Printing (Chairman: George H. Moses; Ranking Member: Duncan U. Fletcher)
 Private Land Claims (Chairman: N/A; Ranking Member: N/A)
 Privileges and Elections (Chairman: William P. Dillingham; Ranking Member: Atlee Pomerene)
 Public Buildings and Grounds (Chairman: Bert M. Fernald; Ranking Member: James A. Reed)
 Public Health and National Quarantine (Chairman: Joseph I. France)
 Public Lands and Surveys (Chairman: Reed Smoot; Ranking Member: Henry L. Myers)
 Railroads (Chairman: Irvine L. Lenroot)
 Readjustment of Service Pay (Special)
 Reforestation (Select)
 Revision of the Laws (Chairman: Richard P. Ernst; Ranking Member: Nathaniel B. Dial)
 Revolutionary Claims (Chairman: N/A; Ranking Member: N/A)
 Rules (Chairman: Charles Curtis; Ranking Member: Lee S. Overman)
 Standards, Weights and Measures (Chairman: N/A; Ranking Member: N/A)
 Tariff Regulation (Select)
 Territories (Chairman: Harry S. New)
 Transportation and Sale of Meat Products (Select)
 Transportation Routes to the Seaboard
 Trespassers upon Indian Lands (Select)
 Veterans Bureau Investigation (Select)
 Whole
 Woman Suffrage (Chairman: N/A; Ranking Member: N/A)

House of Representatives

 Accounts (Chairman: Clifford Ireland; Ranking Member: Frank Park)
 Agriculture (Chairman: Gilbert N. Haugen; Ranking Member: Henderson M. Jacoway)
 Alcoholic Liquor Traffic (Chairman: Addison T. Smith; Ranking Member: William D. Upshaw)
 Appropriations (Chairman: Martin B. Madden; Ranking Member: Joseph W. Byrns)
 Banking and Currency (Chairman: Louis T. McFadden; Ranking Member: Otis Wingo)
 Census (Chairman: Isaac Siegel; Ranking Member: William W. Larsen)
 Claims (Chairman: George W. Edmonds; Ranking Member: Henry B. Steagall)
 Coinage, Weights and Measures (Chairman: Albert H. Vestal; Ranking Member: Samuel M. Brinson)
 Disposition of Executive Papers (Chairman: Merrill Moores; Ranking Member: Arthur B. Rouse)
 District of Columbia (Chairman: Benjamin K. Focht; Ranking Member: James P. Woods)
 Education (Chairman: Simeon D. Fess; Ranking Member: William B. Bankhead)
 Election of the President, Vice President and Representatives in Congress (Chairman: William E. Andrews; Ranking Member: William W. Rucker)
 Elections No.#1 (Chairman: Frederick W. Dallinger; Ranking Member: Claude Benton Hudspeth)
 Elections No.#2 (Chairman: Robert Luce; Ranking Member: Frank Park)
 Elections No.#3 (Chairman: Cassius C. Dowell; Ranking Member: Zebulon Weaver)
 Enrolled Bills (Chairman: Edwin D. Ricketts; Ranking Member: Ladislas Lazaro)
 Expenditures in the Agriculture Department (Chairman: Edward J. King; Ranking Member: Robert L. Doughton)
 Expenditures in the Commerce Department (Chairman: Frank Murphy; Ranking Member: Henry B. Steagall)
 Expenditures in the Interior Department (Chairman: Aaron S. Kreider; Ranking Member: Charles Hillyer Brand)
 Expenditures in the Justice Department (Chairman: Stuart F. Reed; Ranking Member: S. Otis Bland)
 Expenditures in the Labor Department (Chairman: Anderson H. Walters; Ranking Member: Riley J. Wilson)
 Expenditures in the Navy Department (Chairman: Leonard S. Echols; Ranking Member: Rufus Hardy)
 Expenditures in the Post Office Department (Chairman: Frederick N. Zihlman; Ranking Member: Benjamin G. Humphreys)
 Expenditures in the State Department (Chairman: Richard N. Elliott; Ranking Member: William W. Rucker)
 Expenditures in the Treasury Department (Chairman: Porter H. Dale; Ranking Member: R. Walton Moore)
 Expenditures in the War Department (Chairman: Royal C. Johnson; Ranking Member: Edward B. Almon)
 Expenditures on Public Buildings (Chairman: John S. Benham; Ranking Member: Zebulon Weaver)
 Flood Control (Chairman: William A. Rodenberg; Ranking Member: Benjamin G. Humphreys)
 Foreign Affairs (Chairman: Stephen G. Porter; Ranking Member: Henry D. Flood)
 Immigration and Naturalization (Chairman: Albert Johnson; Ranking Member: Adolph J. Sabath)
 Indian Affairs (Chairman: Homer P. Snyder; Ranking Member: Carl Hayden)
 Industrial Arts and Expositions (Chairman: Oscar E. Bland; Ranking Member: Fritz G. Lanham)
 Insular Affairs (Chairman: Horace M. Towner; Ranking Member: Finis J. Garrett)
 Interstate and Foreign Commerce (Chairman: Samuel E. Winslow; Ranking Member: Alben W. Barkley)
 Invalid Pensions (Chairman: Charles E. Fuller; Ranking Member: William W. Rucker)
 Irrigation of Arid Lands (Chairman: Moses P. Kinkaid; Ranking Member: Carl Hayden)
 Judiciary (Chairman: Andrew J. Volstead; Ranking Member: Robert Y. Thomas Jr.)
 Labor (Chairman: John I. Nolan; Ranking Member: Eugene Black)
 Library (Chairman: Norman J. Gould; Ranking Member: Frank Park)
 Merchant Marine and Fisheries (Chairman: William S. Greene; Ranking Member: Rufus Hardy)
 Mileage (Chairman: William S. Greene; Ranking Member: Stanley H. Kunz)
 Military Affairs (Chairman: Julius Kahn; Ranking Member: William J. Fields)
 Mines and Mining (Chairman: Marion E. Rhodes; Ranking Member: Otis Wingo)
 Naval Affairs (Chairman: Thomas S. Butler; Ranking Member: Lemuel P. Padgett)
 Patents (Chairman: Florian Lampert; Ranking Member: Ewin L. Davis)
 Pensions (Chairman: Harold Knutson; Ranking Member: William D. Upshaw)
 Post Office and Post Roads (Chairman: Halvor Steenerson; Ranking Member: Thomas M. Bell)
 Printing (Chairman: Edgar R. Kiess; Ranking Member: William F. Stevenson)
 Public Buildings and Grounds (Chairman: John W. Langley; Ranking Member: Frank Clark)
 Public Lands (Chairman: Nicholas J. Sinnott; Ranking Member: John E. Raker)
 Railways and Canals (Chairman: Loren E. Wheeler; Ranking Member: Thomas H. Cullen)
 Reform in the Civil Service (Chairman: Frederick R. Lehlbach; Ranking Member: Eugene Black)
 Revision of Laws (Chairman: Edward C. Little; Ranking Member: R. Walton Moore)
 Rivers and Harbors (Chairman: S. Wallace Dempsey; Ranking Member: H. Garland Dupre)
 Roads (Chairman: Thomas B. Dunn; Ranking Member: Robert L. Doughton)
 Rules (Chairman: Philip P. Campbell; Ranking Member: Edward W. Pou)
 Standards of Official Conduct
 Territories (Chairman: Charles F. Curry; Ranking Member: Zebulon Weaver)
 United States Shipping Board Operations (Select) (Chairman: Joseph Walsh)
 War Claims (Chairman: Bertrand H. Snell; Ranking Member: Frank Clark)
 Ways and Means (Chairman: Joseph W. Fordney; Ranking Member: Claude Kitchin)
 Woman Suffrage (Chairman: Wallace H. White Jr.; Ranking Member: John E. Raker)
 Whole

Joint committees

 Conditions of Indian Tribes (Special)
 Determine what Employment may be Furnished Federal Prisoners
 Disposition of (Useless) Executive Papers
 Fiscal Relations between the District of Columbia and the United States
 Investigating Naval Base Sites on San Francisco Bay (Chairman: Sen. L. Heisler Ball)
 The Library (Chairman: Sen. Frank B. Brandegee)
 Printing (Chairman: Sen. George H. Moses; Vice Chairman: Rep. Edgar R. Kiess)
 Postal Service
 Readjustment of Service Pay (Special)
 Reorganization
 Reorganization of the Administrative Branch of the Government (Chairman: Walter F. Brown)
 To Investigate the System of Shortime Rural Credits
 Three Hundredth Anniversary of the Landing of the Pilgrims (Chairman: Rep. Henry Cabot Lodge)

Caucuses
 Democratic (House)
 Democratic (Senate)

Officers

Legislative branch agency directors
 Architect of the Capitol: Elliott Woods
 Comptroller General of the United States: John R. McCarl, from July 1, 1921
 Librarian of Congress: Herbert Putnam 
 Public Printer of the United States: Cornelius Ford, until 1921 
 George H. Carter, from 1921

Senate
 Secretary: George A. Sanderson 
 Librarian: Walter P. Scott
 Sergeant at Arms: David S. Barry 
 Chaplain: John J. Muir (Baptist)

House of Representatives
 Clerk: William T. Page 
 Sergeant at Arms: Joseph G. Rodgers 
 Doorkeeper: Bert W. Kennedy 
 Postmaster: Frank W. Collier 
 Clerk at the Speaker's Table: Lehr Fess
 Reading Clerks: Patrick Joseph Haltigan (D) and Alney E. Chaffee (R)
 Chaplain: Henry N. Couden (Universalist), until April 11, 1921
 James S. Montgomery, (Methodist), from April 11, 1921

See also 
 1920 United States elections (elections leading to this Congress)
 1920 United States presidential election
 1920 United States Senate elections
 1920 United States House of Representatives elections
 1922 United States elections (elections during this Congress, leading to the next Congress)
 1922 United States Senate elections
 1922 United States House of Representatives elections

References

External links

 Biographical Directory of the U.S. Congress
 U.S. House of Representatives: House History
 U.S. Senate: Statistics and Lists